Gratianus "Funarius" ( 4th century AD) was an Illyrian soldier of the Roman Empire who flourished in the 4th century. He was the father of Roman emperors, Valentinian I and Valens, founders of the Valentinianic dynasty.

Life
Gratianus originated from the town of Cibalae (Vinkovci), in southern Pannonia Secunda (modern Croatia), possibly in the 280s. During his youth, he obtained the nickname , meaning "the rope-man" because he was a rope salesman. Gratianus joined the army and rose through the ranks to become protector domesticus during the reign of Constantine the Great. A protector domesticus named "...atianus" is attested at Salona (Split) during this time, leading some to think Gratianus could have been stationed there. Gratian's first independent command was as a tribune, probably in the mobile field army of Constantine. During the late 320's or early 330's he was made comes of Africa, possibly to supervise the frontier. However, Gratianus was soon accused of embezzlement and was forced to retire. Gratianus was recalled during the early 340s and was made comes of Britannia. He may have been recalled to command a unit of comitatenses under emperor Constans I during his campaign on the island in the winter of 342/3. After his military career ended, Gratianus returned to his birthplace and lived as a private citizen with good reputation.

In Gratian's retirement, emperor Constantius II (reigned 337–361) confiscated all of his estates because of his suspected support of the usurper Magnentius. Nevertheless, he was still popular within the army; this popularity could have contributed to the successful careers of his sons. When his son Valens became emperor in 364, the Senate in Constantinople decreed a brass statue of him.

Family tree

Sources

 
 
 https://web.archive.org/web/20060516084430/http://www.ancientlibrary.com/smith-bio/1409.html

4th-century deaths
4th-century Romans
Ancient Romans in Britain
Comites rei militaris
Illyrian people
Valentinianic dynasty
Year of birth unknown
Year of death unknown